This is a list of Swedish television related events from 1960.

Events
2 February - Inger Berggren is selected to represent Sweden at the 1960 Eurovision Song Contest with her song "Alla andra får varann". She is selected to be the third Swedish Eurovision entry during Melodifestivalen held at Cirkus in Stockholm.

Debuts

Television shows

Ending this year

Births

Deaths

See also
1960 in Sweden